Western College is a private career college located in Stephenville, Newfoundland and Labrador, Canada. Founded in 1993, the college is a part of CompuCollege and an affiliate of Eastern College.

References

External links 
 Western College

Educational institutions established in 1993
Universities and colleges in Newfoundland and Labrador
Stephenville, Newfoundland and Labrador
1993 establishments in Newfoundland and Labrador